Pia Bajpiee is an Indian actress and model who appears primarily in Bollywood and Kollywood films. She is best known for her performances as Roshini in Venkat Prabhu's comedy Goa and Saro in K. V. Anand's political thriller Ko.

Early life
Bajpiee was born in Etawah but resettled in Delhi to attend a computer course while hoping to gain a break in films. Though her parents opposed her decision, she enrolled for a diploma in computer science, whilst undertaking small jobs such as working as a receptionist and tutoring in order to earn money to make a good portfolio. However, after a year, the office job left her restless and she relocated to Mumbai on her own money. Bajpiee then began to work as a dubbing artiste for serials, but found the job depressing and moved onto modelling appearing in print-ads, commercials and music videos. She featured in adverts for Cadbury alongside veteran actor, Amitabh Bachchan and Sonata with cricketer, Mahendra Singh Dhoni. She was eventually signed on by noted film-maker Priyadarshan to appear in a commercial he directed and it became a platform for her to break into films.

Career
After appearing in Priyadarshan's commercial, he offered her a chance to play a part in his Tamil film production, and Bajpiee accepted the offer after an audition. The comedy film, Poi Solla Porom, was directed by A. L. Vijay and featured Karthik Kumar and Nassar in pivotal roles. Upon release the film won critical acclaim and favourable reviews, with Bajpiee's performance labelled as "bubbly and cheery". She went on to feature in Raju Sundaram's Aegan as a college student, with the film featuring her alongside Ajith Kumar, Nayantara and Navdeep. The film, a remake of 2004 Hindi film Main Hoon Na, received average reviews whilst Bajpiee's portrayal of Amrita Rao's character from the original also garnered a mixed response with a critic citing "she hams it", whilst another cited "she was promising" in her role. In 2009, she appeared in a low-budget Telugu film, Ninnu Kalisaka and won positive acclaim for her portrayal of her character.

On the final day of sets for Aegan, Ajith Kumar introduced her to director Venkat Prabhu, who signed her for Goa sixth months later, to appear as the love interest of Jai in the film. During the making of the film in Langkawi, the crew cited that the hotel was haunted and Bajpiee came out with an account of an eerie experience in her hotel room. Goa became her big break and Bajpiee won critical acclaim for her portrayal of Goan girl Roshini with critics citing that she looked "promising" and "endearing", while the award-winning song "Idhu Varai" was shot featuring her character. With the help of director Vijay, she was selected to portray the lead role in Siddharth Chandrasekhar's comedy Bale Pandiya alongside Vishnu, becoming her first major release as a lead heroine. The film won mixed reviews, though Bajpiee's role was praised with a critic from Sify citing that "Piaa is improving with every film and looks cute".

Bajpiee's next release was K. V. Anand's political thriller Ko, in which she portrayed Saraswathi, a journalist, alongside Jeeva, Karthika Nair and Ajmal. Prior to release Bajpiee has revealed that the film will be a milestone in her career, citing that she is waiting for the release of the film adamantly. The film went on to win commercial and critical acclaim, with Bajpiee's performance winning particular praise. A critic wrote that "Piaa is outstanding in a lead role" and that "her natural flair in comedy brings the house down", whilst other reviewers labelled her as "effective" and that "she does the part well". Her first Malayalam language film was Masters opposite Prithviraj. She was signed as the female lead in the Tamil film Nerungi Vaa Muthamidathe directed by Lakshmy Ramakrishnan.

Filmography

References

External links

 

Living people
Actresses in Tamil cinema
Actresses from Uttar Pradesh
People from Etawah
Actresses in Malayalam cinema
Indian film actresses
21st-century Indian actresses
Actresses in Hindi cinema
Actresses in Telugu cinema
Year of birth missing (living people)